Lozoraitis is the masculine form of a Lithuanian surname. Originated from a name Lazar. Its feminine forms  are: Lozoraitienė (married woman or widow) and Lozoraitytė (unmarried woman).

The surname may refer to:

Stasys Lozoraitis (1898–1983), Foreign Minister of Lithuania from 1934 until 1938, head of Lithuania's government in exile.
Stasys Lozoraitis Jr. (1924–1994), Lithuanian ambassador to the U.S. between 1991 and 1993
Kazys Lozoraitis (1929–2007), the first ambassador of Lithuania to the Holy See and to the Sovereign Military Order of Malta

Lithuanian-language surnames